Nooralotta Maria Neziri (born 9 November 1992 in Turku, Finland) is a Finnish 100 meter hurdler.

She was born of Finnish mother and Macedonian Albanian father in Turku, and has lived in Pori since her early childhood until June 2017. Since then she has moved to Jyväskylä. Neziri's record in 100m hurdles is 12.81. Together with Reetta Hurske, Neziri is also a Finnish record holder in women's indoor 60 metres hurdles with a time of 7.92. Her 100m personal best is 11.48, which makes her the 8th fastest Finnish woman of all-time.

Competition record

References

External links
 
 Nooralotta Neziri Official Homepage

1992 births
Living people
Sportspeople from Turku
Finnish people of Albanian descent
Finnish people of Macedonian descent
Finnish female hurdlers
World Athletics Championships athletes for Finland
Olympic athletes of Finland
Athletes (track and field) at the 2016 Summer Olympics